Celebración: Epic Duets is a 1999 album by Eddie Santiago. It includes his all-time best hits in a duet format, with an all-star cast of vocalists. The album received a positive review from AllMusic.

Track listing
This information adapted from CdUniverse.

Credits

Musicians
 Eddie Santiago (vocals)
 Elvis Crespo, Robby Salinas, Melina Leon 
 Son By 4,Huey Dunbar, George Lamond 
 Victor Manuelle, Charlie Zaa, Obie Bermudez
 Ito Serrano (guitar) 
 Luis Aquino, Angie Machado, Raul Agraz, Richard Viruet (trumpet) 
 Tonito Vazquez, Miguel Rivera, Jorge Diaz, Ozzie Melendez, Pablo Santaella (trombone) 
 Miguel Bonilla (piano, synthesizer) 
 Ramon Sanchez, Sergio George, Edwin Sanchez, Jose "Lenny" Prieto (piano)
 Jose Gazmey, Ricardo Lugo, Ruben Rodriguez (bass) 
 Charlie Sierra (bongos, timbales, percussion)  
 Ray Colon (bongos, percussion) 
 Bobby Allende (congas, timbales) 
 Jimmy Morales, George Delgado (congas) 
 Jeff Lopez (timbales) 
 Marc Quinones (percussion) 
 Luis Cabaracas (programming, background vocals) 
 Daruel Garcia, Chequi Ramos, Ramon Rodriguez, Johnny Rivera, Julio Barreto, Chris Alfines, Luchito Cabarcas (background vocals)

Production
 Authors: William Paz; Alejandro Jaén; Alejandro Vezzani; Luis Angel; Palmer Hernandez
 Arrangers: Cheo Arce; José Gazmey; Miguel Bonilla; Ramón Sánchez
 Director: Sergio George
 Engineers: Vinny Urrutia, Kerk Upper, Jose Caldas
 Recording Studio:

Charts

References

1999 albums
Eddie Santiago albums
Sony Discos albums
Vocal duet albums